Granville C. Coggs  (July 30, 1925 – May 6, 2019) was an American medical doctor, radiologist, U.S. Army Air Force/U.S. Air Force/U.S. Air Force Reserves officer, and trained bombardier pilot with the 477th Bombardment Group attached to the famed Tuskegee Airmen. He was one of the 1007 documented Tuskegee Airmen Pilots.

In 1959, Coggs was the first African American to serve as a staff physician at the Kaiser Hospital in San Francisco, California. In 1972, he became the first African American to lead University of California at San Francisco's Ultrasound Radiology Division.

Early life and family

Coggs was born July 30, 1925, in Pine Bluff, Arkansas. The grandson of enslaved African Americans, Coggs was the youngest of five siblings. He was the son of Dr. Tandy Washington Coggs, an educator, and Nannie Hinkle Coggs, a teacher. Tandy served as the First Superintendent of the now-defunct Arkansas Negro Boys' Industrial School, a juvenile correctional facility for African American male youth in Arkansas.

In 1937, Tandy moved his family from Pine Bluff, Arkansas to Little Rock, Arkansas in Pulaski County to serve as President of Arkansas Baptist College, a position he held until 1955. Coggs transferred to Dunbar High School in Little Rock, Arkansas, graduating in 1942. Though he took some classes at his father's Arkansas Baptist College, Coggs enrolled at Howard University in Fall 1943.

Military career

On December 18, 1943, Coggs enlisted in the U.S. Army Air Force as a Private at Camp Robertson in Little Rock, Arkansas December 18.

The U.S. Army Air Force stationed Coggs at Keesler Air Force Base near racially segregated Biloxi, Mississippi for six weeks. After training, Coggs was transferred to Tuskegee Institute for college training. Coggs' aptitude test qualified him to train as a flying officer, bombardier, navigator or pilot. After training at Tyndall Field in Florida for Aerial Gunnery Training, he served as an aerial gunner, aerial bombardier, multi-engine pilot, and B-25 pilot trainee with the 477th Bombardment group.

In January 1945, Coggs received a commission as a second lieutenant.  On October 16, 1945, Coggs graduated from Cadet Class TE-45-G, Twin Engine Section, receiving a commission as 2nd lieutenant bombardier pilot He received bombardier training at Midland Army Airfield in Midland, Texas, and served as a weather observer at Tuskegee Institute until he was honorably discharged from the U.S. Army Air Corps Fall 1946.  The 477th Bombardment group did not engage in combat during World War II, which ended before Coggs completed training.

In 1985, Coggs retired from the U.S. Air Force Medical Reserve with the rank of lieutenant colonel.

Post-military education
In June 1949, Coggs graduated with a bachelor's degree with distinction from the University of Nebraska. He finished within three years and in the top 3% of his senior class. At the time, Coggs' 91.65 academic average was the highest average ever achieved by an African American student at the University of Nebraska. Coggs was elected to several honor societies including Phi Beta Kappa, Sigma Xi, Phi Lambda Upsilon, the Honorary Chemistry Society, and Theta Nu Honorary Pre-Medical Fraternity.

Coggs was a Spring 1948 initiate of the Eta Chapter of Kappa Alpha Psi fraternity at the University of Nebraska.

In 1949, Coggs enrolled at Harvard Medical School in Cambridge, Massachusetts. He was the sole African American in his first-year medical school class. Coggs financed his education with a $500 grant from the GI bill and a $330 scholarship from Harvard Medical School. Coggs applied to several top medical schools. He was accepted to the University of Southern California's medical school which never enrolled an African American medical student prior to Coggs' application. Instead, Coggs selected Harvard University Medical School in honor of his childhood mentor, prominent African American physician George William Stanley Ish (1883–1970), a member of Harvard Medical School's Class of 1909. Ish inspired the 1918 founding of the now-defunct J. E. Bush Memorial Hospital in Little Rock, Arkansas and the defunct McRae Memorial Tuberculosis Sanatorium for African Americans.

During his tenure in Massachusetts, Coggs  shared a residential suite with Dr. Martin Luther King Jr., who was working on his PhD in divinity at Boston University.

After graduating with a M.D. from Harvard Medical School in June 1953, Coggs returned to the U.S. Air Force as a Medical Intern.

Medical career
Coggs became a radiologist and breast cancer specialist. In 1958, he completed a three-year medical residency in radiology at the University of California, San Francisco. In 1959, Coggs was the first African American to serve as a staff physician at the Kaiser Hospital in San Francisco, California as a full-time Associate Clinical Professor of Radiology. In 1972, he became the first African American to lead University of California at San Francisco's Ultrasound Radiology Division.

In 1969, Coggs received the National Medical Association's Silver Medal Award for his scientific exhibit, “Non-Surgical Diagnosis and Treatment of Renal Cysts.” His exhibit also received an honorable mention at the 1970 American Medical Association's annual meeting in Chicago, Illinois.

In 1975, Coggs became a tenured professor of radiology at the University of Texas Health Science Center in San Antonio, Texas. In 1983, Coggs founded the San Antonio Breast Evaluation Center, which served as the role model for Breast Cancer Disease Diagnostic Centers across the U.S. he was inventor and patent owner of a non-invasive patented device for Breast Cancer Detection. The device, the portable "precision breast lesion localizer", was designed to precisely position a probe tip relative to a target lesion in a bodily protuberance. Coggs also invented a central x-ray beam guided breast biopsy system attached to a standard mammography machine; the system enhances precise, accurate breast biopsies.

Dr. Coggs retired in 1989 as professor of radiology at University of Texas Health Science Center in San Antonio, Texas.

In 1990 he returned to practice as a general radiologist, working at Kaiser Memorial Hospital in Karnes County, Texas from 1994 to 2003. In 2003, Coggs worked as a radiologist at Gonzaba Medical Group in San Antonio. In December 2004, Coggs became a radiologist at Brook Army Medical Center in San Antonio.

Personal life
While at Tuskegee Institute, Coggs met Maud Currie, marrying her on August 20, 1946. The couple had three children: son Granville Currie Coggs (who was killed in a construction accident at age 7), daughter Anita Coggs Rowell, and daughter Carolyn Coggs.

In 1955, the Coggs were the first African American family to integrate the Terra Linda Community of Eichler Homes in the San Francisco Bay Area. Though there was massive resistance to the Coggs move to Terra Linda, residential developer Joseph Eichler supported the Coggs by offering to purchase the homes of any other residents who opposed integration.

Coggs was a musician and vocalist, playing the stringed "Gut Bucket" Bass for the Night Blooming Jazzmen trio. He also played Flute and Piccolo for the Las Gallinas Valley Sanitary District Non-Marching Band. Coggs sang tenor in Terra Linda's Christ Presbyterian Church Choir and the San Antonio Mastersingers.

Coggs was also multiple event gold medalist in the Senior Olympics at local, regional, state and national levels.

At age 81, Coggs attempted to audition for American Idol. Officials informed him he exceeded the age limit by 53 years.

Honors, book
 In 2001, Coggs was inducted into the Arkansas Black Hall of Fame.   
 Coggs was a Fellow with the American College of Radiology (FACR) and a Charter Member of the Society of Radiologists in Ultrasound.  
 Kappa Alpha Psi Fraternity, Inc. honored Coggs as its Scientist of the Year.  
 In 2007, Coggs received the Congressional Gold Medal as a member of the Tuskegee Airmen.  
 Coggs attended the January 20, 2009 and January 20, 2013, inaugurations of President Barack Obama.   
 Coggs and his daughter Anita were the authors of "Soaring Inspiration: The Journey of an Original Tuskegee Airman".
 In honor of Coggs' 90th birthday in 2015, the JBSA-Randolph's 99th Flying Training Squadron retired Coggs' 99th FTS nametag.

Death
Coggs died on May 6, 2019, in San Antonio, Texas.  Reverend Otis I. Mitchell officiated Cogg's funeral services.  Coggs was interred at Fort Sam Houston National Cemetery, Section 54, Site 653, in San Antonio, Texas in Bexar County, Texas.

See also
List of Tuskegee Airmen Cadet Pilot Graduation Classes
List of Tuskegee Airmen
Military history of African Americans
 Dogfights (TV series)
 Executive Order 9981
 The Tuskegee Airmen (movie)

References 

1925 births
2019 deaths
Tuskegee Airmen
United States Army Air Forces officers
Military personnel from Tuskegee, Alabama
African-American aviators
Military personnel from Arkansas
Military personnel from Texas
University of California, San Francisco faculty
University of Texas Health Science Center at San Antonio faculty
University of Nebraska–Lincoln alumni
Harvard Medical School alumni
21st-century African-American people
Burials at Fort Sam Houston National Cemetery
 Howard University alumni